Liberty Street can refer to:

Liberty Street (TV series), a Canadian TV show
Liberty Street (Manhattan), a street in Lower Manhattan, New York City
Liberty Street (Savannah, Georgia), major street in Savannah, Georgia
Liberty Street, an imprint of Time Inc. Books
"Liberty Street", a song from The New Basement Tapes
Liberty Street, a never-built section of Disneyland that would evolve into Liberty Square in Walt Disney World